Wat Ratchabophit or formally Wat Ratchabophit Sathitmahasimaram Ratchaworawihan, is a Buddhist temple on Fueang Nakhon Road, Bangkok, along Khlong Khu Mueang Doem, not far from Wat Pho and the Grand Palace. The temple was built during the reign of King Chulalongkorn (Rama V). The abbot of the temple is Somdet Phra Ariyavongsagatanana, the current Supreme Patriarch of Thailand.

Architecture

Inside the temple
The temple features a unique layout, with its  and  joined by a circular courtyard, at the center of which stands a gilded chedi. The golden chedi (43m high) is covered with orange-coloured tiles and on top of the chedi, there is a golden ball. There is a relic of Buddha inside and the chedi was built in Sri Lankan style.  The ordination hall has 10 door panels and 28 window panels each decorated with gilded black lacquer on the inside.

The interior of the temple or bod, is inspired by gilded Italian architecture that Rama V saw on a visit to Europe. The entrance doors are 3m high and are decorated with inlaid mother-of-pearl, which represents various medals and decorations.  The drum tower is a two-storeyed one with hexagonal spires decorated with Benjarong ceramic nagas and Erawan heads.

Royal Cemetery

On the west end of the temple grounds is the Royal Cemetery, with numerous monuments to major and minor members of the Thai Royal Family, most notably those in the immediate family of King Chulalongkorn. One of the memorials, the Rangsi Vadhana Memorial, contains the ashes of Mahidol Adulyadej, Srinagarindra and Galyani Vadhana.  A Christian church is on the grounds, as are many chedis and Khamer-face towers.

Gallery

Notes

References

External links

Ratchabophit
19th-century Buddhist temples
1860s in Siam
Thai Dhammayut Buddhist temples
Registered ancient monuments in Bangkok
Gothic Revival architecture in Thailand